Trust No One is the debut solo album by Jane's Addiction and former Red Hot Chili Peppers guitarist Dave Navarro, released on June 19, 2001 on Capitol.

In 2009, Navarro stated: "I did a solo record [Trust No One] where I did everything and toured, and as great as an experience as that was, it’s not what I want to do full time. It’s a mind fuck. I don’t dig it. It’s something I do once in a while and I certainly intend to do it again, but I’m much better suited to be part of an ensemble."

Background and release
Navarro recorded an album in 1998 under the name "Spread", playing the majority of instruments. After learning the name was in use by a band and a failed attempt to buy the name, he opted to release it under his own.

The style and theme of the album are very dark, revolving around events taking place in Navarro's life at the time. Many songs talk about the growing loneliness of the rock star lifestyle and the messy divorce he had experienced.

The album's title may also have originated with the murder of his mother when Navarro was a teenager. "I shut my eyes to how precious life is," he said, "and instead I grew to believe that nobody could be trusted."

Drummer Matt Chamberlain plays on all songs bar "Very Little Daylight" and parts of "Sunny Day", with drums by Roy Mayorga of Stone Sour, and "Not for Nothing", with drums by Navarro's Jane's Addiction bandmate Stephen Perkins.

"Everything" contains a sample of "The Sporting Life" by Diamanda Galás and John Paul Jones, from the album of the same name.

The opening track "Rexall" was the first single, released on May 18, 2001. It was complemented by a music video directed by Honey. It was named after a drugstore in Los Angeles where his parents met. The album's second single, "Hungry", was released on September 3, 2001. Its music video starred Carmen Electra and was directed by Chris Robinson. Both tracks found moderate success upon release; however, the video for "Rexall" was pulled from airplay after the September 11 attacks, due to its depictions of towers falling in a city.

Track listing

B-sides
 "Easy Girl" – 5:09
 "Somebody Else" – 3:35
 "The Bed" (Lou Reed) – 4:26

Personnel
Adapted from the album liner notes.

Musicians

 Dave Navarro – lead vocals, acoustic and guitars, bass, synthesizer, keyboards, sampling
 Matt Chamberlain – drums on "Rexall", "Hungry", "Sunny Day" (verses and chorus), "Mourning Son", "Everything", "Not for Nothing", "Avoiding the Angel", "Very Little Daylight" and "Slow Motion Sickness"
 Rich Costey – programming, production, additional guitar on "Rexall" and "Hungry", synth programming on "Sunny Day", chorus guitar on "Everything", vibraphone on "Very Little Daylight"
 Mike Elizondo – bass on "Rexall"
 Roy Mayorga – drums on "Sunny Day" (bridge and outro) and "Very Little Daylight", percussion on "Venus In Furs" and "Sunny Day"
 Holly Palmer – vocals on "Hungry"
 DJ Numark – additional production and drum programming on "Sunny Day"
 Jon Brion – intro voice and slide bass on "Mourning Son", additional guitar and ring modulator guitar on "Very Little Daylight"
 Pinky Villandry – backing vocals on "Mourning Son"
 Ben Hall-Roberts – strings on "Everything"
 Twiggy Ramirez – bass on "Everything"
 Stephen Perkins – drums on "Not for Nothing"
 Monet Mazur – background scream on "Not for Nothing"
 Danny Saber – additional production, programming, bass on "Venus in Furs"
 Brendan O'Brien – bass and keyboards on "Slow Motion Sickness"

Production

 Andrew Slater – co-production (on "Rexall"), executive producer
 Brendan O'Brien – mixer on "Hungry", "Mourning Son", "Everything", "Not for Nothing", "Avoiding the Angel", "Slow Motion Sickness"
 Rich Costey – mixer on "Rexall", "Sunny Day", "Very Little Daylight", "Venus in Furs"
 Dale Lawton – assistant engineer (Mad Hatter)
 Geoff Walcha – assistant engineer (Sunset Sound)
 Ryan Williams – assistant engineer (Southern Tracks)
 Dave Ahlert – assistant engineer (Media Vortex)
 Steve Mixdorf – assistant engineer (NRG)
 Mark Plati – additional engineering
 Dave Schiffman – additional engineering
 Danny Saber – additional engineering
 Jimmy Boyle – additional engineering
 Eddy Schreyer – mastering (at Oasis Mastering)
 Gene Grimaldi – mastering (at Oasis Mastering)

References

2001 debut albums
Capitol Records albums
EMI Records albums